Widen is an unincorporated community and coal town in Clay County, West Virginia, United States.

The community was named after L. G. Widen, a railroad official.

References

Unincorporated communities in Clay County, West Virginia
Coal towns in West Virginia